Mersin is a large city and port on the Mediterranean coast of southern Türkiye. It is the provincial capital of the Mersin Province (formerly İçel). It is made up of four district governorates, each having its own municipality: Akdeniz, Mezitli, Toroslar and Yenişehir.

Mersin lies on the western side of Çukurova, a geographical, economic and cultural region of Türkiye. It is an important hub for Türkiye's economy, with Türkiye's largest seaport being located here. The city hosted the 2013 Mediterranean Games

As urbanisation continues eastward, a larger metropolitan region combining Mersin with Tarsus and Adana (the Adana-Mersin Metropolitan Area) is in the making with more than 3.3 million inhabitants.

Adana Şakırpaşa Airport (ADA), from Mersin city centre is the nearest international airport. There are ferry services from Mersin to Famagusta (Mağusa) in Northern Cyprus. Mersin is linked to Adana via Tarsus by way of TCDD trains.

Etymology 
The city was named after the aromatic plant genus Myrsine in the family Primulaceae, a myrtle that grows in abundance in the area. The 17th-century Ottoman traveler Evliya Çelebi also recorded in his Seyahatnâme that there was a clan named the Mersinoğulları (Sons of Mersin) living in the area. In the 19th century Mersin was also referred to as Mersina.

History

Prehistory 
This coast has been inhabited since the 9th millennium BC. Excavations by John Garstang of the hill of Yumuktepe have revealed 23 levels of occupation, the earliest dating from ca. 6300 BC. Fortifications were put up around 4500 BC, but the site appears to have been abandoned between 350 BC and 300 BC.

Classical era 

Over the centuries, the city was ruled by many states and civilisations including the Hittites, Assyrians, Urartians, Persians, Greeks, Armenians, Seleucids and Lagids. During the Ancient Greek period, the city bore the name Zephyrion (Greek: Ζεφύριον) and was mentioned by numerous ancient authors. Apart from its natural harbour and strategic position along the trade routes of southern Anatolia, the city profited from trade in molybdenum (white lead) from the neighbouring mines of Coreyra. Ancient sources attributed the best molybdenum to the city, which also minted its own coins. The area later became a part of the Roman province of Cilicia, which had its capital at Tarsus, while nearby Mersin was the major port. The city, whose name was Latinised to Zephyrium, was renamed as Hadrianopolis in honour of the Roman emperor Hadrian.
After the death of the emperor Theodosius I in 395 and the subsequent permanent division of the Roman Empire, Mersin fell into what became the Byzantine Empire.

The city was an episcopal see under the Patriarchate of Antioch. Le Quien names four bishops of Zephyrium: Aerius, present at the First Council of Constantinople in 381; Zenobius, a Nestorian, the writer of a letter protesting the removal of Bishop Meletius of Mopsuestia by Patriarch John of Antioch (429–441); Hypatius, present at the Council of Chalcedon in 451; and Peter, present at the Council in Trullo in 692. The bishopric is included in the Catholic Church's list of titular sees, but since the Second Vatican Council no new titular bishop of this Eastern see has been appointed.

Medieval Period 
Cilicia was conquered by the Arabs in the early 7th century, by which time it appears Mersin was a deserted site. The Arabs were followed by the Egyptian Tulunids, then by the Byzantines between 965 and c.1080 and then by the Armenian Kingdom of Cilicia. Under Armenian Cilicia, the region of Mersin served as the powerbase for the House of Lampron. From 1362 to 1513 the region was captured and governed by the Ramadanid Emirate, first as a protectorate of the Mamluk Sultanate, then as an independent state for roughly a century and then as a protectorate of the Ottoman Empire from 1513 until 1518 when it was annexed into the Ottoman Empire and turned into an imperial province.

Ottoman Empire 

 
During the American Civil War, the region became a major supplier of cotton to make up for the high demand due to shortage. Railroads were extended to Mersin in 1866 from where cotton was exported by sea, and the city developed into a major trade centre.
In 1909, Mersin's port hosted 645 steamships and 797,433 tons of goods. Before World War I, Mersin exported mainly sesame seeds, cotton, cottonseed, cakes and cereals, and livestock. Cotton was exported to Europe, grain to Turkey and livestock to Egypt. Coal was the main import into Mersin at this time. Messageries Maritimes was the largest shipping line to use the port at Mersin.

In 1918, the Ottoman Empire collapsed and Mersin was occupied by French and British troops in accordance with the Treaty of Sèvres. It was recovered by the Turkish Army in 1921 at the end of the Franco-Turkish War. In 1924, Mersin was made a province, and in 1933 Mersin and İçel provinces were merged to form the (greater Mersin) İçel Province. The capital of the province was Mersin. In 2002 the name of the province was changed to Mersin Province.

As of 1920, Mersin had five piers at its port, with one privately owned by a railroad company serving Mersin, Tarsus, and Adana.

Modern Mersin 

Today, Mersin is a large city spreading out along the coast, with skyscrapers, huge hotels, an opera house, expensive real estate near the sea or up in the hills, and many other modern urban amenities. it has the longest seashore in Turkey as well as in the Eastern Mediterranean.

The Metropolitan Municipality has rescueed long stretches of the seafront with walkways, parks and statues, and there are still palm trees on the roadsides especially where the younger generation like to hang out in the cafés and patisseries of smart neighbourhoods such as Pozcu or Çamlıbel with many well-known shops and restaurants. The older city centre is a maze of narrow streets and arcades of little shops and cafes. Around the fish market several stalls and shops sell Mersin's signature dish tantuni as well as grilled liver sandwiches.

Since the start of the Syrian War in 2011 Mersin has acquired a large population of Syrian refugees whose presence is reflected in some of the shops, cafes and restaurants especially in the area of Mezitli known as Little Latakia.

On 6 February 2023 Mersin was shaken by the twin Turkey-Syria earthquakes. Citizens made homeless in cities further to the east also flocked to Mersin in search of shelter.

Local Attractions 
There are six museums within the Mersin urban area; Mersin Archaeological Museum, Mersin Atatürk Museum, Mersin Naval Museum, Mersin State Art and Sculpture Museum, Mersin Urban History Museum, Mersin Water Museum.

In the western suburb of Viranşehir (Ruined City) the remains of the ancient city of Soli/Pompeiiopolis stand close to the sea. Only two colonnades dating from the 2nd or 3rd century are obvious although the outline of the agora and of a mole from the harbour can just about be made out.

The Chasms of Heaven and Hell are located in the rural region of Silifke, a district in Mersin. The chasms are two sinkholes that were naturally formed from underground waters melting the layer of limestone above. The heaven sinkhole has a small monastery located in the corner of the entrance. The deepest point of the sinkhole is 135 meters deep. The hell sinkhole is 128 meters deep. In mythology, there is a story of Zeus temporarily trapping Typhon in the sinkhole.

Geography 
Unlike the mountainous rugged terrain of the whole province Mersin is located at the western edge of the Çukurova plain. Earthquake risk of the city is relatively low especially compared to other regions of Turkey, but due to its closeness to several other fault lines in Anatolia, the city center, which was built on an alluvial deposit is considered to be a risk region.

Climate 
Mersin has a hot-summer Mediterranean climate (Köppen climate classification: Csa, Trewartha climate classification: Cs), a type of subtropical climate with hot, humid summers and mild, wet winters. Mersin has its highest rainfall in winter. The driest months are in summer with hardly any rainfall at all. The highest temperature of Mersin was recorded on 3 September 2020 at 41.5 °C (106.7 °F).

Demographics 

The population of the city was 1,035,652 (Mersin Province: 1,840,425) according to 2019 estimates. The population of the sub municipalities within Greater Mersin is shown below: As of a 2021 estimation, the population of the Adana-Mersin Metropolitan Area was 3,300,000 inhabitants of whom 1,064,850 lived in the Mersin area which consists of the aforementioned four urban districts, making it the 11th most populous area of Türkiye.

Religion 
The Mersin Interfaith Cemetery, in the Yusuf Kılıç district, is serves as a cemetery for all religions with graves of Muslims, Christians and Jews.

Economy and transportation 
The Port of Mersin is the mainstay of city's economy. It is an international hub for many vessels routing to European countries, and is currently being operated by PSA International.

Next to the port is the Mersin Free Zone, established in 1986 as the first free zone in Turkey, with warehouses, shops, assembly-disassembly, maintenance and engineering workshops, banking and insurance, packing-repacking, labelling and exhibition facilities. The zone is a publicly owned cenre for foreign investors, close to major markets in the (Middle East, North Africa, East and West Europe, the Russian Federation and Central Asia. In 2002 the free zone's trading volume was US$51.8 billion.

Historically, Mersin was a major producer of cottonseed oil. The area around Mersin is famous for citrus and cotton production. Bananas, olives and assorted other fruits are also produced.

Forum Mersin, the biggest shopping mall, is home to more than 100 shops.

Mersin has highway connections to the north, east and west. It is also connected to the southern railroad. Mersin railway station in the district of Akdeniz has been in use since 1886. Opened on 28 February 2015, Mersin Bus Terminus is the terminus for intercity bus services, replacing the bus station that had been in the city centre since 1986.
Work is underway to complete the Akkuyu Nuclear Power Plant, Turkey's first nuclear power plant, some 80 miles west of Mersin. Environmental groups, such as Greenpeace, have opposed the construction.

Culture 
Mersin is home to a State Opera and Ballet, the fourth in Turkey after Istanbul, İzmir and Ankara. Mersin International Music Festival was established in 2001 and takes place every October.

The photography associations Mersin Fotoğraf Derneği (MFD) and Mersin Olba Fotoğraf Derneği (MOF) are amongst the city's most popular and active cultural organisations. Some cultural activities are sponsored by the İçel Sanat Kulübü (Art Club of Mersin) and Mediterranean Opera and Ballet Club.

The Mersin Citrus Festival is a festival organized to promote the citrus produced in Mersin. The festival typically includes folk dancers from different traditions and sculptures constructed from different types of citrus. The first festival was held in 2010. The festival is held annually on a weekend in November.

Cuisine 
Mersin is best known in Turkey for its tantuni, and restaurants serving it can be found all over the country. The provincial cuisine includes specialties such as:
Ciğer kebap, (liver on mangal), typically served on lavaş with an assortment of meze at 12 skewers at a time,
Tantuni, a hot lavaş wrap consisting of julienned lamb stir-fried on a sac on a hint of cottonseed oil,
Bumbar or mumbar, lamb intestines filled with a mixture of rice, meat and pistachios, that are served either grilled or steamed, famous throughout the Levant ,
Cezerye, a lokum-like delight made of caramelized carrot paste, covered in (sometimes sliced) pistachios and often also sprinkled with ground coconut,
Karsambaç, a variety of shaved ice served with pekmez or honey as toppings,
Künefe, a wood-oven baked dessert based on a mixture of cheese and pastry; known all throughout the Levant,
Kerebiç, a shortbread filled with pistachio paste, also famous throughout the Levant,
Şalgam suyu, a beverage made of fermented red carrots, very popular in Southern Turkey.

Media 
Local TV channels
 Kanal 33
 İçel TV
 Sun RTV
 Güney TV
Local radio channels
 Radyo Metropol (101.8)
Tarsus Süper FM (91.1)
 Tempo 94 FM (94.3)
 Örgün FM (94.7)
 Tarsus Star FM (95.5)
 Tarsus Radyo Time (97.7)
 Flaş FM (98.3)
 Mix FM (91.6) (sadece yabancı müzik, 1993-günümüz)
 Kent Radyo (98.5)

Sports 

The city was formerly home to Mersin İdman Yurdu, a football club that played in the Süper Lig as recently as the 2015–16 season. The men's basketball team of the Mersin Büyükşehir Belediyesi S.K. plays in the Turkish Basketball League while its women's basketball team plays in the Turkish Women's Basketball League.

The city has two football stadiums: Mersin Arena, with a seating capacity of 25,534, and Tevfik Sırrı Gür Stadium, which has a capacity of 10,128. The men's and women's basketball teams of the Mersin Büyükşehir Belediyesi S.K. play their home matches at the Edip Buran Sport Hall, which has a seating capacity of 2,700.

Eleven new sports venues were built for Mersin to host the 2013 Mediterranean Games. The Servet Tazegül Arena, the fourth biggest indoor arena of Turkey with its 7,500 seating capacity, hosted the men's basketball events and the volleyball finals of the Games. The athletics and paralympic athletics events were held at the Nevin Yanıt Athletics Complex.

Education 

Mersin University was founded in 1992 and started teaching in 1993–1994, with eleven faculties, six schools and nine vocational schools. The university has had about 10,000 graduates, has broadened its current academic staff to more than 2,100 academicians, and enrols 22,000 students a yer.

Toros University is a non-profit private foundation established in Mersin in 2009.

Çağ University

Tarsus University

International relations

Twin towns – sister cities 
Mersin is twinned with:

 Durban, South Africa
 Gazi Mağusa, Northern Cyprus 
 Kherson, Ukraine
 Klaipėda, Lithuania
 Kushimoto, Japan, where there is a Turkish Memorial and Museum in commemoration of the 1890-sunken Ottoman frigate Ertuğrul. A street in Mersin is named after the Japanese town.
 Nizhnekamsk, Russia
 Oberhausen, Germany
 Ölgii, Mongolia
 Ufa, Russia
 Valparaíso, Chile
 West Palm Beach, United States

Notable people 
 Evelyn Baghtcheban – one of the pioneers of opera and choral music in Iran
 Anton Christoforidis – NBA Light Heavyweight Champion
 Muazzez İlmiye Çığ – academic and writer
 Haldun Dormen – theatre & film actor and director
 Musa Eroğlu – composer, musician
 Uğur Ersoy – engineering academic
 Reşit Galip – former minister of National education
 Ahmet Mete Işıkara – scientist
 Müfide İlhan – first woman mayor in Turkey in the 1950s
 Gencay Kasapçı – painter
 Özgecan Aslan - Mersin University Psychology student
 Bergen - arabesque music and classical music singer and actress
 Konca Kuriş - the feminist İslamist writer, journalist and activist
 Metin Özülkü - musician, singer-songwriter and arranger
 Ahmet Kireççi (aka Mersinli Ahmet) – Olympic medalist wrestler
 Nevit Kodallı – composer
 Seyhan Kurt – poet, writer, sociologist
 Cemal Mersinli – a pasha of the Ottoman Empire
 İpek Ongun – writer
 Macit Özcan – former mayor
 Ersan Özseven – Turkish professional basketball player
 Fikri Sağlar – former Minister of Culture
 Suna Tanaltay – writer and psychologist.
 Nevin Yanıt – female sprinter (European champion in 100 m hurdles)
 Atıf Yılmaz – film director and producer
 Mabel Matiz – pop music singer-songwriter
 Tuğba Şenoğlu – volleyball player
 Emre Demir – footballer
 Manuş Baba - Pop folk singer-songwriter

Mersin Metropolitian Municipality Mayors 
 1984-1989 Hüseyin Okan Merzeci ANAP
 1989-1994 Ahmet Kaya Mutlu SHP 
 1994-1997 Hüseyin Okan Merzeci ANAP
 1997-1999 Hasan Kuriş ANAP
 1999-2002 Macit Özcan DSP
 2002-2014 Macit Özcan CHP
 2014-2017 Burhanettin Kocamaz MHP
 2017-2019 Burhanettin Kocamaz Good Party
 2019-current Vahap Seçer CHP

See also 

 Mersin Martyrs' Memorial
 Gözne
 Soli, Cilicia
 Kazanlı
 List of mayors of Mersin
 Atatürk Monument (Mersin)
 Gulf of Mersin
 Dikilitaş, Mersin
 Mersin Feneri
 Atatürk Parkı
 Tırmıl
 Mersin Citrus Festival
 Radyo Çukurova

References 

 Blue Guide, Turkey, The Aegean and Mediterranean Coasts, pp. 556–557.
 Blood-Dark Track: A Family History (Granta Books) by Joseph O'Neill, contains a detailed and evocative history of the city, viewed from the perspective of a Christian Syrian family long resident in Mersin.
 Richard Talbert, Barrington Atlas of the Greek and Roman World,, p. 66

External links 

 Princeton Encyclopedia of Classical Sites
 Catholic Encyclopedia "Zephyrium"

 
Çukurova
Cilicia
Mediterranean port cities and towns in Turkey
Ancient Greek archaeological sites in Turkey
Cities in Turkey
Populated coastal places in Turkey
Zephyrium
Seaside resorts in Turkey
Populated places in Mersin Province
Geography of ancient Anatolia